José Hernández Bethencourt (June 6, 1927 – February 28, 2009), better known as Pepe Hern, was an American supporting actor, who usually played Spanish and Latino (primarily Mexican) roles throughout his career. Pepe Hern participated in nearly 50 films (most of which were premiered in television). He played his most important roles in Borderline and Make Haste to Live. He was brother of actor Tom Hernández.

Biography 
Pepe Hern was born on June 6, 1927 in New Jersey, to Spanish immigrants Domingo Hernández and Dominga Bethencourt. His parents were natives from Puerto de la Cruz on the island of Tenerife (Canary Islands). He had two older brothers, both of which were  born in the Canary Islands. Pepe Hern debuted in his first film at the age of 21 in Bodyguard (1948). After this, his career spanned nearly 40 years. William A. Seiter gave to Hern his two most important roles of the 1950s in the films Borderline (1950) and Make Haste to Live (1954).

Later, in 1968, Hern had a role in Madigan. In the following decades, Hern portrayed a peasant in The Magnificent Seven (1960) and a priest in Joe Kidd (1972). This role was one of his last appearances in films.

It was on television where Hern maintained greater continuity and visibility, participating in several TV series episodes such as The Rifleman (1961–1962), The Fugitive (1963), I Spy (1966), The High Chaparral (1967), Bonanza (1964–1970), The Streets of San Francisco (1972), Lou Grant (1977), The Bionic Woman (1977), and Charlie's Angels (1979). In 1984, Hern appeared in an episode of Murder, She Wrote and an episode of Hill Street Blues.

He died on February 28, 2009, in Los Angeles, California.

Filmography

Film 
This is a list of films of Pepe Hern

TV series 
This is a list of television series in which he has appeared.

References

External links 
 Pepe Hern – películas, fotos, noticias, vídeos – www.hoycinema.com

1927 births
People from New Jersey
Male actors from New Jersey
American people of Canarian descent
2009 deaths